The 155th Airlift Squadron (155 AS) is a unit of the Tennessee Air National Guard 164th Airlift Wing. It is assigned to Memphis Air National Guard Base, Tennessee and is equipped with the Boeing C-17 aircraft.

History

World War II
Organized and trained in the Northeast United States by First Air Force. During training was part of the air defense of the northeast, being attached to the New York and Boston Fighter Wings.

The squadron flew P-47 Thunderbolts until they were replaced by P-51 Mustangs in November 1944.

From October 1943 until January 1944, operated as escort for B-17 Flying Fortress/B-24 Liberator bombers that attacked such objectives as industrial areas, missile sites, airfields, and communications.

Fighters from the 461st engaged primarily in bombing and strafing missions after 3 January 1944, with its targets including U-boat installations, barges, shipyards, aerodromes, hangars, marshalling yards, locomotives, trucks, oil facilities, flak towers, and radar stations. Bombed and strafed in the Arnhem, Netherlands area on 17, 18, and 23 September 1944 to neutralize enemy gun emplacements providing support to Allied ground forces during Operation Market-Garden. In early 1945, the squadron's P-51 Mustangs clashed with German Me 262 jet aircraft. The squadron flew its last combat mission, escorting B-17's dropping propaganda leaflets, on 7 May 1945.

Remained in the United Kingdom during the balance of 1945, most personnel were demobilized and returned to the United States, with aircraft being sent to storage facilities in the UK. The squadron was administratively inactivated at Camp Kilmer New Jersey on 10 November 1945 without personnel or equipment.

Tennessee Air National Guard
Re-designated: 155th Fighter Squadron, and allotted to Tennessee ANG, on 24 May 1946, extended federal recognition and activated on 3 February 1947. Assigned to the 118th Fighter Group at Berry Field, Nashville, flying the P-47 Thunderbolt aircraft. Was converted to a Tactical Reconnaissance Squadron in February 1951, being re-equipped with the RB-26 Invader.

Was Federalized and placed on active duty, 2 March 1951, remaining at Memphis Municipal Airport. Released from active duty and returned to Tennessee state control, 31 December 1952. The unit was redesignated as a jet photo reconnaissance organization on 1 April 1956 and equipped with the RF-84 Thunderflash, the jets being received directly from the factory for use in this mission.

Was expanded and the organization in Memphis was upgraded to a Group level on 1 April 1961, the squadron being assigned to the new 164th Military Airlift Group. Was realigned to becoming a strategic transport unit under Military Air Transport Service, being equipped with C-97 Stratofreighters. Conversion to this aircraft brought a worldwide mission with operations to such places as Europe, Japan, South America, Australia and South Vietnam.

During May 1966, the unit set numerous records, to include 10 round trips to Southeast Asia and 1702 flying hours in one month, all accomplished primarily dedicated part-time personnel.  May 1967 brought the introduction of the C-124 Globemaster, affectionately known as "Old Shakey". Along with Old Shakey, the squadron's personnel performed numerous humanitarian missions as well as routine support to Military Airlift Command (MAC).

The C-124 was given a well-deserved rest in 1974 when she was retired from military service, reluctantly giving up her berth to the C-130 Hercules. The C-130s were transferred to other units in April 1992 when the unit received the first of eight C-141 Starlifter aircraft. In 2004, the squadron retired the C-141 and began operate the C-5A Galaxy. 18 December 2012 the 1st C-17A of 8 arrived.

Lineage

 Constituted as 359th Fighter Squadron on 8 December 1942
 Activated on 12 December 1942
 Inactivated on 10 November 1945
 Re-designated: 155th Fighter Squadron, and allotted to Tennessee ANG, on 24 May 1946.
 Extended federal recognition and activated on 3 February 1947
 Re-designated as: 155th Tactical Reconnaissance Squadron (Night Photographic), 1 February 1951
 Federalized and placed on active duty, 2 March 1951
 Released from active duty and returned to Tennessee state control, 31 December 1952
 Re-designated as: 155th Tactical Reconnaissance Squadron (Jet), 1 April 1956
 Re-designated as: 155th Air Transport Squadron, 1 April 1961
 Re-designated as: 155th Military Airlift Squadron, 8 January 1966
 Re-designated as: 155th Tactical Airlift Squadron, 1 August 1974
 Re-designated as: 155th Airlift Squadron, 16 April 1992
 Re-designated as: 155th Airlift Squadron, 1 October 1995

Assignments
 356th Fighter Group, 12 Dec 1942 – 10 Nov 1945
 118th Fighter Group, 3 February 1947
 118th Composite Group, 1 September 1950
 118th Tactical Reconnaissance Group, 1 February 1951
 164th Air Transport Group, 1 April 1961
 164th Military Airlift Group, 8 January 1966
 164th Tactical Airlift Group, 1 August 1974
 164th Airlift Group, 16 April 1992
 164th Airlift Wing, 1 October 1995

Stations

 Westover Field, Massachusetts, 12 December 1942
 Groton Army Airfield, Connecticut, 11 March 1943
 Mitchel Field, New York, 30 May 1943
 Grenier Field, New Hampshire, 4 Jul-19 Aug 1943
 RAF Goxhill (AAF-345), England, 26 August 1943

 RAF Martlesham Heath (AAF-359), England, 12 Oct 1943 – 4 Nov 1945
 Camp Kilmer, New Jersey, 9–10 Nov 1945
 Memphis Municipal Airport (later International Airport, later Memphis Air National Guard Base), 3 February 1947 – Present

Aircraft

 P-47 Thunderbolt, 1943–1944
 P-51 Mustang, 1944–1945
 P-47 Thunderbolt, 1947–1951
 RB-26 Invader, 1951–1956
 RF-84F Thunderstreak, 1956–1961

 C-97 Stratofreighter, 1961–1967
 C-124 Globemaster II, 1967–1974
 C-130 Hercules, 1974–1992
 C-141B Starlifter, 1992–2004
 C-5A Galaxy, 2004–2012
 C-17 Globemaster III, 2012–Present

Aircraft flying in this unit
C-17A
94-0065 (Dec15); 95-0104 (Dec15); 97-0042 (Dec15); 02-1100 (Dec15)

References

 Maurer, Maurer. Combat Squadrons of the Air Force: World War II. Maxwell Air Force Base, Alabama: Office of Air Force History, 1982.
 164th Airlift Wing history page
 164th Airlift Wing@globalsecurity.org
 Rogers, B. (2006). United States Air Force Unit Designations Since 1978.

External links

Squadrons of the United States Air National Guard
Military units and formations in Tennessee
155
Memphis International Airport